WPJI-LP (94.9 FM) is an American low-power FM radio station licensed to Hopkinsville, Kentucky. The station is currently owned by Pilgrims Journey, Inc.

References

External links
 

PJI-LP
Radio stations established in 2004
2004 establishments in Kentucky
PJI-LP